Rossington is a civil parish in the metropolitan borough of Doncaster, South Yorkshire, England.  The parish contains ten listed buildings that are recorded in the National Heritage List for England.  Of these, one is listed at Grade II*, the middle of the three grades, and the others are at Grade II, the lowest grade.  The parish contains the village of Rossington and the surrounding area.  The listed buildings include houses and associated structures, two churches, a milepost, a shop, a well house, and a war memorial.


Key

Buildings

References

Citations

Sources

Lists of listed buildings in South Yorkshire
Buildings and structures in the Metropolitan Borough of Doncaster